is a village located in Nagano Prefecture, Japan. , the village had an estimated population of 890, and a population density of 9.9 persons per km². Neba is known for its sweet corn, shiitake, and mountain trout.

Geography
Neba is located mountainous far southern border of Nagano Prefecture with Aichi Prefecture and Gifu Prefecture. Mount Chausuyama (1415 meters) is located in the southeast of the village. Part of the village is within the borders of the Tenryū-Okumikawa Quasi-National Park.

Surrounding municipalities
 Nagano Prefecture
 Urugi
 Hiraya
 Aichi Prefecture
 Toyota
 Shitara
 Toyone
Gifu Prefecture
 Ena

Climate
The village has a climate characterized by hot and humid summers, and cold winters (Köppen climate classification Cfa).  The average annual temperature in Neba is 12.0 °C. The average annual rainfall is 2185 mm with September as the wettest month. The temperatures are highest on average in August, at around 23.8 °C, and lowest in January, at around -0.4 °C.

Demographics
Per Japanese census data, the population of Neba has declined by more than two-thirds from its peak around 1950.

History
The village was once part of Mikawa Province until the 16th century, after which it became part of Shinano Province. Neba is also one of the many reported sites at which Takeda Shingen died. According to Koyo Gunkan, Takeda's strategy book, Neba is the place where he made camp and died in 1573 after the Siege of Noda Castle. The village of Neba was established with the creation of the modern municipalities system on April 1, 1889.

Education
Neba has one public elementary school and one public middle school operated by the village government. The village does not have a high school.

Transportation

Railway
The village does not have any passenger railway service

Highway

Local attractions
 In Neba, there is a very old Japanese cedar. It is estimated as 1,800 years old, with a height of 40m and a width of 14m. It was designated a Japanese Natural Monument in 1944.

References

External links
 
Official Website 

 
Villages in Nagano Prefecture